Ketu is a historical region in what is now the Republic of Benin, in the area of the town of Kétou (Ketu). It is one of the oldest capitals of the Yoruba-speaking people, tracing its establishment to a settlement founded by a descendant of Oduduwa, also known as Odudua, Oòdua and edua. The regents of the town were traditionally styled "Alaketu", and are related directly to Ile-Ife in present-day Nigeria.

Ketu is one of the sixteen original kingdoms established by the children of Oduduwa in Oyo mythic history, though this ancient pedigree has been somewhat neglected in contemporary Yoruba historical research, which tends to focus on communities within Nigeria. The exact status of Ketu within the Oyo empire however is contested. Oyo sources claim Ketu as a dependency with claims that the Ketu paid an annual tribute and that its ruler attended the Bere festival in Oyo. In any case, there is no doubt that Ketu and Oyo maintained friendly relations largely due to their historical, linguistic, cultural and ethnic ties.

The kingdom was one of the main enemies of the ascendant kingdom of Dahomey, often fighting against Dahomeans as part of Oyo's imperial forces, but ultimately succumbing to the Fon in the 1880s as the kingdom was ravaged. Many of Ketu's citizens were sold into slavery during these raids, which accounts for the kingdom's importance in Brazilian Candomblé. Ketu is often known as Queto in Portuguese orthography.

Ewe connection

Ewe traditions refer to Ketu as Amedzofe ("origin of humanity") or Mawufe ("home of the Supreme Being"). It is believed that the inhabitants (or at least some) of Ketu originally belonged to the Oyo people of Nigeria and were pressed westward by a series of wars between the 12th and the 15th centuries. In Ketu, the ancestors of the Gbe speaking peoples (Ewe, Fon, Aja etc.) separated themselves from other refugees and began to establish their own identity, but were pressed even further westward by the Yoruba during the 14th and 15th centuries.

 c.1500 - Yoruba state moved its capital to Ketu.
 1886 - Conquered by Dahomey.
 1893 - Restored by France under protectorate.

See also
List of rulers of the Yoruba state of Ketu

References
Parrinder, E.G. The Story of Ketu: An ancient Yoruba kingdom. Ibadan, Nigeria, Ibadan University Press, 1956.

Kingdoms of Benin
Yoruba history

ca:regne de Ketu